David Junior Deen Sesay (born 18 September 1998) is a professional footballer who plays as a defender for Wealdstone. Born in England, he represented the Sierra Leone national team.

Club career

Early career
Born in Brent, Sesay joined Watford in 2007, turning professional in June 2016. On 13 April 2018, it was announced that Sesay along with numerous other graduates, were to leave Watford at the end of their contracts in June.

Crawley Town
Proceeding his release, Sesay opted to join League Two club Crawley Town on a two-year deal. On 4 September 2018, Sesay made his Crawley debut during their EFL Trophy group-stage tie against Tottenham Hotspur U23s, featuring for just under 20 minutes and scoring the winning penalty in the shootout. He made his league debut on 29 December 2018, starting in a 0–0 draw away to Newport County. At the end of the season, he was awarded Crawley Town's Young Player of the Year award. In June 2020, Sesay signed a one-year contract extension with the club. He was released by Crawley Town at the end of the 2020–21 season.

Barnet
Sesay joined Barnet on a one-month rolling contract on 24 August 2021.

Wealdstone
On 26 November 2021, Sesay signed for Wealdstone.

Sesay joined Weymouth on loan in December 2022. The loan was later extended for a month.

International career
Born in England, Sesay is of Kenyan and Sierra Leonean descent. He was called up to the Kenya national football team in March 2019, although he turned down the call-up in order to help Crawley Town in their relegation battle. In October 2021 he was called-up by the Sierra Leone national football team for friendly fixtures that month. He debuted for Sierra Leone in a 1–1 friendly tie with South Sudan on 7 October 2021.

Sesay was named in Sierra Leone's squad for the 2021 Africa Cup of Nations, but did not make an appearance at the tournament.

Career statistics

Club

International

References

1998 births
Living people
Footballers from the London Borough of Brent
Sierra Leonean footballers
Sierra Leone international footballers
English footballers
Sierra Leonean people of Kenyan descent
English sportspeople of Sierra Leonean descent
English people of Kenyan descent
Watford F.C. players
Crawley Town F.C. players
Barnet F.C. players
Wealdstone F.C. players
Weymouth F.C. players
Association football fullbacks
English Football League players
Black British sportspeople
National League (English football) players
2021 Africa Cup of Nations players